The men's 200 metres at the 2011 European Athletics U23 Championships was held at the Městský stadion on 15 and 16 July.

Medalists

Schedule

Results

Round 1
Qualification: First 3 in each heat (Q) and 4 best performers (q) advance to the Semifinals.

Semifinals
Qualification: First 3 in each heat (Q) and 2 best performers (q) advance to the Final.

Final

Participation
According to an unofficial count, 28 athletes from 20 countries participated in the event.

References

External links

200 M
200 metres at the European Athletics U23 Championships